The Optare MetroRider was a midibus manufactured by Optare between 1989 and 2000.

History
Optare based the original design on the MCW Metrorider after it bought the rights from Metro Cammell Weymann after the latter decided to cease production. It was launched in November 1989, with 1,159 produced before it was succeeded by the Optare Solo in 2000. 

The MetroRider was an integral bus, with the chassis and body constructed as a single structure. It was sold abroad in kit form, in countries such as Malaysia. Four electric MetroRiders were sold to the Oxford Bus Company in 1993 and two compressed natural gas powered versions were sold to Stagecoach Cambus in 1996.

References

External links

MetroRider
Midibuses
Electric midibuses
Vehicles introduced in 1989